Sebastián Vizcaíno Bay (Spanish: Bahía de Sebastián Vizcaíno) is a prominent bay along the west coast of the Baja California Peninsula in northwestern Mexico. It is named after explorer Sebastián Vizcaíno.

Geography
The bay lies on the Pacific Ocean coast of Baja California state in San Quintín Municipality, and of Baja California Sur state in Mulegé Municipality.

Cedros Island and Isla Natividad are located within the bay, and west of the mainland Vizcaíno Peninsula.

Sebastián Vizcaíno Bay is protected within the El Vizcaíno Biosphere Reserve.

See also

Bays of Mexico on the Pacific Ocean
Landforms of Baja California
Landforms of Baja California Sur
Mulegé Municipality
Cedros Island
Protected areas of Baja California
Protected areas of Baja California Sur